Football Victoria is the state governing body for soccer in Victoria, Australia. It is affiliated with Football Australia, the sport's national governing body.

History
Football Victoria began operation in 1884 under the name Anglo Australian Football Association of Victoria and is one of the oldest sporting associations in Victoria. It has had several name changes over the years, but has survived as the governing body of soccer in Victoria since this time.

In 2009, player registrations for soccer in Victoria passed 50,000, the highest number in the federation's history.

In 2018, the federation was renamed from "Football Federation Victoria" to "Football Victoria".

Formation
Football Federation Victoria oversees all aspects of the sport within the state, however there are twelve regional associations that manage local leagues and competitions in their areas.

 Albury Wodonga Football Association
 Ballarat & District Soccer Association
 Bendigo Amateur Soccer League
 Cobram Junior Soccer Association
 Football Federation Victoria Geelong Region
 Gippsland Soccer League
 Latrobe Valley Soccer League
 Moama-Echuca Soccer Association
 Shepparton Junior Soccer Association
 Football Federation Victoria Sunraysia
 Swan Hill Soccer League
 South West Victorian Football Association

Soccer pyramid in Victoria

For the full soccer pyramid in Australia, see Australian soccer league system.

The soccer pyramid in Victoria comprises the seven levels of soccer in Victoria below the A-League. It has a hierarchical format that features promotion and relegation between all levels (aside from the A-League and regional leagues). All clubs in the system are eligible for entry to the FFA Cup, and are seeded in accordance to tier standing.

For the 2013 season, Football Federation Victoria announced a restructure of the league. Tiers 5, 6 and 7, which were previously known as Provisional League 1, 2 and 3 respectively were removed, as was the Metropolitan League (tier 8). They were replaced by State League 4 and 5, divided geographically into North, East, South and West divisions, thus making State League 5 the lowest division in which are club can theoretically be promoted into the VPL. The Victorian Premier League and State League 1 to 3 remained the same.

2013 will also see the inaugural State League Champions series take place in Victoria. The champion of each league from State League 1 and below will play a finals series against the champions of other regions in their division as follows:
 State League 1 North-West v South-East
 State League 2 North-West vs South-East
 State League 3 North-West vs South-East
 State League 4 North vs West & South vs East, with winners meeting in a final 
 State League 5 North vs West & South vs East, with winners meeting in a final

Various regional leagues that are affiliated with the FFV, although they are not connected to the Victorian soccer pyramid and thus there is no promotion or relegation between them. These leagues include Bayside FA Premier, Gippsland Soccer League, North Eastern Soccer League, Bendigo Amateur Soccer League, Ballarat & District Soccer Association, Geelong Regional Football Association and South West Victorian Football Association, as well as various junior leagues.

Men's pyramid

Women's pyramid

References

External links
Football Federation Victoria Official website

Soccer governing bodies in Australia
Soccer in Victoria (Australia)
Sports governing bodies in Victoria (Australia)
Sports organizations established in 1884